MTV Sarja was a Finnish television channel owned and operated by MTV3, in cooperation with the TV4 Group. It was a Finnish version of TV4 Guld.

References

External links
www.mtv3.fi/sarja

Defunct television channels in Finland
Television channels and stations established in 2008
Bonnier Group
Television channels and stations disestablished in 2014